The River Roden may refer to:

 The River Roden, Shropshire, a tributary of the River Tern in England
 The River Roden, Berkshire, a tributary of the River Pang in England